Hosackia is a genus of flowering plants in the family Fabaceae (legumes). It is native to western North America, from British Columbia in Canada to Mexico.

Taxonomy
Hosackia belongs to a group of species traditionally placed in the tribe Loteae of the subfamily Faboideae. The taxonomy of this group is complex, and its division into genera has varied considerably. Many species of Hosackia were formerly placed in a broadly defined genus Lotus. A molecular phylogenetic study in 2000 based on nuclear ribosomal ITS sequences confirmed the view that the "New World" (American) and "Old World" (African and Eurasian) species of Lotus did not belong in the same genus. When narrowly circumscribed, Hosackia was monophyletic. New World species at one time placed in Hosackia have been transferred to Acmispon, Ottleya and Syrmatium.

Species
, Plants of the World Online accepted the following species:

Hosackia alamosana Rose
Hosackia chihuahuana S.Watson
Hosackia crassifolia Benth.
Hosackia endlichii Harms
Hosackia gracilis Benth.
Hosackia hintoniorum (B.L.Turner) D.D.Sokoloff
Hosackia incana Torr.
Hosackia oaxacana Greenm.
Hosackia oblongifolia Benth.
Hosackia pinnata (Hook.) Abrams
Hosackia repens G.Don
Hosackia rosea Eastw.
Hosackia stipularis Benth.
Hosackia yollabolliensis (Munz) D.D.Sokoloff

References

 
Flora of North America
Fabaceae genera